The electoral district of Thomastown is an electorate of the Victorian Legislative Assembly. It currently includes the suburbs of Lalor and Thomastown, and parts of Fawkner, Reservoir and Wollert, and has been in existence since 1985.

The seat is extremely safe for the Labor Party. At the 2002 election, Labor frontbencher Peter Batchelor won the seat with over 80% of the two-party-preferred vote, making Thomastown the safest seat in the state.

The seat's first member, Beth Gleeson, died whilst in office in December 1989. The resulting February 1990 by-election, held when support for Labor had plummeted as a result of an economic crisis, was nearly won by the Australian Democrats.

Members for Thomastown

Election results

See also
 Parliaments of the Australian states and territories
 List of members of the Victorian Legislative Assembly

References

External links
 Electorate profile: Thomastown District, Victorian Electoral Commission

1985 establishments in Australia
Electoral districts of Victoria (Australia)
City of Whittlesea
Electoral districts and divisions of Greater Melbourne